Line 3 of the Dalian Metro (R3)  is a rapid transit line running from southwest to northwest Dalian. It was opened on the 8 November 2002.

Six stations are elevated, and the remainder are at grade. Transfers to trams and trains are possible at the Dalian Railway Station.

The northern area of the city, where the Economic and Technology Development Zone is located, is not well-served by buses. The metro line beginning at the downtown commercial center (near the Dalian railway station) runs through five administrative districts of the city and serves as an express transport between the northern (developing) region and the downtown area. The line extends northward to Golden Pebble Beach (Jinshitan Scenic Area), a national scenic park  from the city center. The Jiuli branch route was opened on 28 December 2008. The branch route connects central Dalian with Jinzhou District (金州区) with fourteen stations from south to north. The branch begins at Dalian Development Area station and stretches northwest ending at Jiuli station.

All stations have side platforms. Tracks in the platform area have no ballast (gravel); however, tracks outside the station are on ballast. All stations are covered by a combination of transparent corrugated sheets and a concrete roof.

In October 2017, most station names were re-translated from Pinyin into conventional English.

Since 18 November 2021, operation schedule of the branch section has changed to only Dalian Development Area - Jiuli, branch trains no longer run through Dalian Railway station, to allow testing of trains of line 13, and through trains between line 3 branch and line 13.

Opening timeline

Service routes
  — 
  — 
  — 

Stations

References

03
Railway lines opened in 2002